Sir Alexander James Beresford Beresford Hope PC (25 January 1820 – 20 October 1887), known as Alexander Hope until 1854 (and also known as A. J. B. Hope until 1854 and as A. J. B. Beresford Hope from 1854 onwards), was a British author and Conservative politician.

Biography

Early life
Beresford Hope was the third and youngest son of Thomas Hope, the writer and patron of art, and his wife the Hon. Louisa Beresford, daughter of William Beresford, 1st Baron Decies, younger son of George Beresford, 1st Marquess of Waterford. The Hope family was of Scottish descent but had been settled in The Netherlands for many years, where they had a successful mercantile and banking business, but had returned to Britain after French troops occupied the country in 1795. Beresford Hope was educated at Harrow and Trinity College, Cambridge. His father died in 1831 and his mother married as her second husband her first cousin General William Beresford, 1st Viscount Beresford. In 1854 he inherited his stepfather's estates, including Bedgebury Park, Kent, and Beresford Hall, Staffordshire, and assumed by Royal licence the additional surname of Beresford.
His brother was Henry Thomas Hope.

Parliamentary career

He sat as Member of Parliament for Maidstone from 1841 to 1852 and from 1857 to 1859. He unsuccessfully contested Cambridge University in 1859 and Stoke-upon-Trent in 1862, but was successfully returned for the latter constituency in 1865. From 1868 until his death he was one of two representatives for Cambridge University. From 1865 he sat as an independent Conservative. He vehemently opposed the Reform Act of 1867 proposed by Benjamin Disraeli, nicknaming Disraeli "the Asian mystery" (referring to Disraeli's Jewish origins). Disraeli retorted by alluding to Beresford Hope's "Batavian graces" (in reference to his family's Dutch origins). He never held ministerial office but was sworn of the Privy Council in 1880.

Philanthropy and writing

Beresford Hope's most prominent public feature was his ardent support for the Church of England.  According to George Wakeling, "in Parliament his voice, in his slow, rather harsh, but very impressive way, would be raised on every Church question". He was especially steadfast in his opposition to the Deceased Wife's Sister Bill.

While at Trinity College in 1839, he was, along with John Mason Neale and Benjamin Webb a founder of the Cambridge Camden Society (later the Ecclesiological Society). He re-established it in 1879 as the St Paul's Ecclesiological Society A very wealthy man, he purchased St Augustine's Abbey in Canterbury in 1844, to rebuild it as a college for missionary clergy. He also supervised the commissioning and construction of the church of All Saints, Margaret Street, London, to the designs of William Butterfield on behalf of the Ecclesiological Society.

In about 1850 Beresford Hope inherited the Beresford estate in Alstonefield and Sheen in Staffordshire. He wanted to make Sheen "the Athens of the Moorlands". He rebuilt the church, to the design of William Butterfield, and built a school and a lending library. It was remarked in The Ecclesiologist that "the general effect is that of an ecclesiastical colony in the wilds of Australia". Not all Hope's plans for Sheen were realized.

Beresford Hope was also a writer on archaeological, architectural, ecclesiastical and artistic subjects and was President of the Royal Institute of British Architects from 1865 to 1867 and a trustee of the British Museum. He co-founded the Saturday Review in 1855. He was elected a Fellow of the Royal Society in 1880. In 1873 he was invited to lay the foundation stone of the new Christ Church in St Leonards-on-Sea, East Sussex.

Beresford Hope was active in the funding Canon Nathaniel Woodard's national network of Woodard Schools.

Family

Beresford Hope married Lady Mildred Arabella Charlotte Henrietta, daughter of James Gascoyne-Cecil, 2nd Marquess of Salisbury, and sister of Robert Gascoyne-Cecil, 3rd Marquess of Salisbury, in 1842. They had three sons and seven daughters. Lady Mildred was a leading figure in London society for many years. She died in March 1881. Beresford Hope survived her by six years and died in October 1887, aged 67, at his home, Bedgebury Park, Goudhurst, Kent. He was buried at Christ Church, Kilndown, Kent. His daughter, Bridget, married Alban Gibbs, 2nd Baron Aldenham.

Works
 Essays (1844)
 English cathedrals in the XIX. century (1861)
 The social and political bearings of the American disruption (1863)
 Cathedrals in their missionary aspects (1872)
 Hints towards peace in ceremonial matters (1874)
 Worship in the church of England (1874)
 Strictly tied-up (1880)
 The Brandreth (1882)
 Worship and order (1883)

Notes

References

Article on Alexander Beresford Hope at americancivilwar.org

External links 

 
 

1820 births
1887 deaths
Alexander
People educated at Harrow School
Alumni of Trinity College, Cambridge
Conservative Party (UK) MPs for English constituencies
Members of the Parliament of the United Kingdom for the University of Cambridge
UK MPs 1841–1847
UK MPs 1847–1852
UK MPs 1857–1859
UK MPs 1865–1868
UK MPs 1868–1874
UK MPs 1874–1880
UK MPs 1880–1885
UK MPs 1885–1886
UK MPs 1886–1892
Fellows of the Royal Society
Presidents of the Royal Institute of British Architects
Members of the Privy Council of the United Kingdom
Politicians from London